Tshwane Regiment is an infantry regiment of the South African Army. As a reserve unit, it has a status roughly equivalent to that of a British Army Reserve or United States Army National Guard unit.

History

This Regiment was originally established as the Yskor Pretoria Commando in 1969 and over the years several commando units and regiments, such as Hillcrest, Munitoria, Regiment Pretorius and 2 Regiment Northern Transvaal were amalgamated with Regiment Schanskop. 

In December 2002, the name "Tshwane Regiment" was approved to be in line with the area where the Regiment is situated.

Operations
Members of this Regiment have been deployed internally and externally of South Africa. The Regiment has been deployed in the Soutpansberg Military Area and during elections.

Leadership

Current Dress Insignia

Notes

References

External links 

Infantry regiments of South Africa
Military units and formations in Pretoria